The Georgia Southwestern and Gulf Railroad was incorporated in 1906 and began operations in 1910 on about  of track leased from the Albany and Northern Railway between Cordele and Albany, Georgia, USA.  The GS&G was purchased by the Georgia Northern Railway in 1939, and in 1942 operations were returned to the Albany and Northern.

References

Defunct Georgia (U.S. state) railroads
Railway companies established in 1906
Railway companies disestablished in 1942
Predecessors of the Southern Railway (U.S.)
1906 establishments in Georgia (U.S. state)
American companies disestablished in 1942
American companies established in 1906